Alfred Knoll (21 April 1928 – 21 July 2002) was an Austrian field hockey player. He competed in the men's tournament at the 1952 Summer Olympics.

References

External links
 

1928 births
2002 deaths
Austrian male field hockey players
Olympic field hockey players of Austria
Field hockey players at the 1952 Summer Olympics
Place of birth missing